Mačva is a geographical and historical region in the northwest of Central Serbia, on a fertile plain between the Sava and Drina rivers. The chief town is Šabac. The modern Mačva District of Serbia is named after the region, although the region of Mačva includes only the northern part of this district. A small northern part of Mačva region is in the Autonomous Province of Vojvodina, in the Syrmia District.

Name
The region is named after a town of Mačva, which existed in the Medieval Ages near the river Sava. In the past, the region was also known as Lower Srem, while the neighbouring region on the northern bank of the river Sava (present-day Srem) was known as Upper Srem.

In Serbian Cyrillic, the region is known as Мачва, in Serbian Latin, Bosnian and Croatian as Mačva, in Hungarian as Macsó or Macsóság, in Turkish as Maçva, and in German as Matschva.

History
Throughout history, the region of Mačva has successively been a part of the Roman Empire (1st-4th century); the Byzantine Empire (4th-5th century; 5th-7th century; and 11th-12th century), the Hun Empire (5th century), Avar Khaganate (7th century), the Slavic-controlled territories (7th-9th century), the Bulgarian Empire (9th-11th century), the Kingdom of Hungary (12th-13th century; 14th century; 15th century; 16th century), the State of Serb king Stefan Dragutin (13th-14th century), the Serbian Empire (14th century), the State of Nikola Altomanović (14th century), the Moravian Serbia (14th century), the Serbian Despotate (15th century), the Ottoman Empire (15th century; 16th-18th century; 18th-19th century), the Kingdom of Serbia under the Habsburg Monarchy (1718–1739), Karađorđe's Serbia (1804–1813), the vassal Principality of Serbia (1815–1878), the independent Principality of Serbia (1878–1882), the Kingdom of Serbia (1882–1918), the Kingdom of Serbs, Croats and Slovenes (1918–1929), the Kingdom of Yugoslavia (1929–1941), the area governed by the Military Administration in Serbia (1941–1944), the Socialist Federal Republic of Yugoslavia (1944–1992), the Federal Republic of Yugoslavia (1992–2003), and Serbia and Montenegro (2003–2006). Since 2006, the region is part of an independent Serbia.

Mačva was inhabited since the Stone Age. Before the Roman conquest, the region was inhabited by Illyrians and Celtic Scordisces. In the first century BC, the region was conquered by the Romans, and Scordisces were pushed to the northern side of the Sava river. During the Roman rule, the region was part of the provinces of Moesia and Pannonia.

Roman rule lasted until the 5th century, and the region was conquered by the Sarmatians, Huns, Goths, Gepids, Lombards  and Avars. In the 6th century, Slavic tribes settled in the region.

The region was then included into Byzantine Empire, Frankish Kingdom, and Bulgarian Empire. In the 11th century, the Byzantine province known as the Theme of Sirmium included both, the present-day region of Srem and Mačva, thus Srem became the designation for both regions.

In the 13th century, the region was included into the Kingdom of Hungary and Banovina of Mačva was formed in 1247. Banovina was named after a town called Mačva, but the location of this settlement has not been clearly established in modern times. It is suspected that the town of Mačva existed a few kilometers down the river from modern Šabac.

During the Hungarian administration the region was ruled by several powerful bans. Hungarian king Béla IV granted authority over Mačva to Rostislav Mikhailovich, a refugee Russian prince. In the 13th century, Béla of Macsó (grandson of Béla IV) ruled Mačva as well as Usora and Soli (areas across Drina river in today's northeastern Bosnia).

Between 1282 and 1316 the Serb King Stefan Dragutin ruled the Kingdom of Srem, which consisted of Mačva, Usora, Soli and some adjacent territories. His capital cities were Debrc (between Belgrade and Šabac) and Belgrade. In that time the name Srem was designation for two territories: Upper Srem (present day Srem) and Lower Srem (present day Mačva). Kingdom of Srem under the rule of Stefan Dragutin was located in Lower Srem. According to some sources, Stefan Dragutin also ruled over Upper Srem, but other sources are mentioning another local ruler, Ugrin Csák, who ruled over Upper Srem and Slavonija.

At first, Stefan Dragutin was a vassal of the Hungarian king, but since the central power in the Kingdom of Hungary collapsed, both, Stefan Dragutin and Ugrin Csák were de facto independent rulers. Stephen Dragutin died in 1316, and was succeeded by his son, King Vladislaus II (1316–1324). Vladislaus II was defeated by the king of Serbia, Stefan Dečanski, in 1324, and after this, Mačva became a subject of dispute between the Kingdom of Serbia and the Kingdom of Hungary.

In the 14th century, the bans of the Garay family (Paul Garay, Nicholas I Garay and his son Nicholas II Garay) which were under the Hungarian suzerainty expanded their rule not only to Bosnia but to Srem and the last one also became the ban of Slavonia and Croatia, which was also part of the Kingdom of Hungary at the time. Mačva was part of the Serbian Empire of Stefan Dušan and part of the state of the Serbian prince Lazar Hrebeljanović.

In the 15th century, Mačva was part of Serbian Despotate, and since 1459, it was part of the Ottoman Empire. In the 16th-17th century, Mačva was part of the Ottoman Sanjak of Zvornik, which was part of the Pashaluk of Bosnia. It was under Ottoman administration until 1718, when it was captured by the Habsburgs. Between 1718 and 1739, Mačva was part of the Habsburg-administered Kingdom of Serbia, and since 1739, it was again part of the Ottoman Empire. In this time, the region was part of the Ottoman Sanjak of Smederevo. In 1788, the "Mačvanska knežina" ("Princedom of Mačva" - a local administrative unit) had 25 villages with 845 houses. The name of the local administrator ("oberknez") was Uroš Drmanović. Between 1804 and 1815, Mačva was part of Serbia ruled by Karađorđe. Since 1817, it was part of the autonomous Principality of Serbia, and since 1882, part of the Kingdom of Serbia.

During World War I, the Austro-Hungarian army occupied the region and committed war crimes against innocent Serb civilians in Mačva and Podrinje.  Beginning in 1918, the region was part of the Kingdom of Serbs, Croats and Slovenes (later renamed Yugoslavia). Between 1918 and 1922 the region was part of Podrinjski okrug, between 1922 and 1929 part of Podrinjska oblast, while between 1929 and 1941 it was part of Drina Banovina. Between 1941 and 1944, Mačva was part of the area governed by the Military Administration in Serbia, and since 1945, it has been part of the Socialist Republic of Serbia and new socialist Yugoslavia. After the breakup of Yugoslavia and Yugoslav wars, Mačva became part of an independent Serbia.

Geography
Mačva is located in the southern edge of Pannonian basin, between the Cer and Fruška Gora Mountains. Territory of Mačva is divided among 3 municipalities: Šabac (including 18 settlements of Mačva), Bogatić (including 14 settlements of Mačva), and Sremska Mitrovica (including 7 settlements of Mačva). Total number of settlements in Mačva is 39, of which 37 are rural, and 2 (Šabac and Mačvanska Mitrovica) are urban.

Inhabited places

List of largest inhabited places in Mačva (with population figures):
 Šabac (55,163)
 Bogatić (7,350)
 Majur (6,854)
 Pocerski Pričinović (5,992)
 Badovinci (5,406)
 Prnjavor (4,464)
 Mačvanska Mitrovica (3,896)

Note: Mačvanska Mitrovica is geographically located in Mačva, but it is part of Syrmia District (in the Autonomous Province of Vojvodina).

Education
Several teachers' associations exist in Mačva.

Famous people from Mačva

 Rostislav Mikhailovich, a Rus' prince, first Duke of Mačva (after 1248–1262)
 Stefan Dragutin, king of Lower Srem (Mačva) between 1282 and 1316.
 Stefan Vladislav II, king of Lower Srem (1316–1325).
 Uroš Drmanović, oberknez of "Mačvanska knežina" in 1788.
 Stojan Čupić (1765–1815), also known as "Zmaj od Noćaja", was a Serbian voivod in the First Serbian Uprising.
 Milorad Ruvidić (1863 - 1914), Serbian architect.
 Laza Lazarević (1851–1891), Serbian writer and psychiatrist.
 Janko Veselinović (1862–1905), Serbian literate.
 Bora Simić - Joja (born in 1929), poet.
 Milić Stanković (1934–2000), a controversial painter who became known as Milić od Mačve (meaning "Milić of Mačva").
 Dušan Kovačević (born in 1948), literate, dramaturgist.
 Dragan Martinović (born in 1957), painter.
 Nenad Stanković (born in 1965), painter.
 Miloš Blagojević (born in 1989), sculptor.

See also
 Mačva District
 Banate of Mačva

References

Sources

External links

 www.macva.com

 
Geographical regions of Serbia
Historical regions in Serbia
Geography of Šumadija and Western Serbia
Geography of Vojvodina